Wavetek was an electronic test equipment manufacturer that made function generators, signal generators and service monitors. Although Wavetek did not invent the function generator, it made them commercially popular.  The company's swept RF/microwave signal generators of early 1980's were virtually unmatched in component quality and had user interface features that included a birdy marker system for frequency counting, automatic level control, remote interface port, and front panel designed for quick and simple user control.  Following obsolescence, the company technology eventually devolved into lower cost digital instrumentation.

History
Before Terrence Gooding, president and CEO of Wavetek, took Wavetek private in 1991, the company had 800 employees, 260 of whom worked in San Diego. The company had plants in the US states California, Florida, Indiana, and New York. It had overseas locations in Germany, Hong Kong and the United Kingdom.

In 1998, Wandel & Goltermann purchased Wavetek, and changed its name to Wavetek, Wandel & Goltermann (WWG).

In January 2000, test equipment manufacturer Fluke Corporation acquired Wavetek's Precision Management Division, and announced their intention to keep the Wavetek name for existing products.  WWG kept Wavetek's LAN business unit, cable networks, fiber optics and wireless test gear.

Merging
In May 2000, WWG merged with hand-held test equipment developer TTC to form Acterna.

In 2003, Acterna's LAN tester division which developed LANTech Ethernet test instruments was acquired by Ideal Industries.

Acquisition
On August 3, 2005, optical communications company JDSU acquired Acterna for $760 million, which became part of JDSU's Test and Measurement Group.

References

External links

Archived website of Wavetek at the Internet Archive

Electronics companies of the United States
Electronic test equipment manufacturers
Manufacturing companies based in San Diego